Portrait of Count Antonio Porcia and Brugnera (Italian: Ritratto del conte Antonio di Porcia e Brugnera) is an oil painting by Titian, dated to between 1535 and 1540, which hangs in the Pinacoteca di Brera in Milan.

Description 
A half-length figure in black, the face turned forwards, an energetic head in repose; across the breast is a broad gold chain with an ornament hanging from it; in the somewhat sombre lower portion of the picture there is the shining knob of the sword and the spot of white in the cuff. His aristocratic right-hand rests idly on the balustrade. In the far distance, a last gleam of light still illumines for a moment a broad fall of water. The work is signed "Titianus" on the window ledge.

Date 
According to Gronau, in style the picture has so much affinity with works of about 1540 to 1543 that it must be assigned to that date. The Brera dates it slightly earlier, between 1535 and 1540.

Provenance 

 Formerly in Castle Porcia, near Pordenone. 
 Presented to the Brera Art Gallery in 1892 by the Duchess Litta Visconti.

References

Sources 

 Gronau, Georg (1904). Titian. London: Duckworth and Co; New York: Charles Scribner's Sons. pp. 130–131, 293.
 Ricketts, Charles (1910). Titian. London: Methuen & Co. Ltd. p. 183, plate xcvi.
 "Portrait of Count Antonio Porcia and Brugnera". Pinacoteca di Brera. Retrieved 10 March 2023.

Portraits by Titian
Paintings in the collection of the Pinacoteca di Brera